Seilbahn Rigiblick, a funicular railway in Zürich-Oberstrass, Switzerland
 Theater Rigiblick, a theater in Zürich-Oberstrass